A list of people from St Albans, Hertfordshire, England.

 Robert of St. Albans, an English crusader and later a Muslim Ayyubid soldier.
 The St Albans printer, an anonymous printer who produced eight works, the first six in Latin, the last two in English between 1480 and 1486. The most important and last of these was the famous 'Boke of St Albans' 
 Olivia Allison (b. 1990), GB synchronised swimmer, attended St Albans Girls' School
 Rod Argent (b. 1945), musician and songwriter with the group The Zombies, formed while the members (Colin Blunstone, Chris White, Paul Atkinson, Hugh Grundy, and Paul Arnold) were at school in St Albans
 Francis Bacon (1561–1626), philosopher, scientist and statesman, lived at Old Gorhambury House. Bacon was made Viscount St Albans in 1618.
 Nicholas Bacon (1509–1579), Lord Keeper of the Great Seal under Queen Elizabeth I and father of Francis Bacon built Old Gorhambury House
 John Ball (c. 1338–1381), Lollard priest, played prominent part in the English Peasants' Revolt of 1381.
 Edmund Beckett, 1st Baron Grimthorpe (1816–1905), lawyer, amateur horologist, and architect; best known locally for rebuilding the west front of St Albans Cathedral in 1880–1885 at his own expense, but also designed the clock movement for Big Ben. He lived at Batchwood Hall.
 William Henry Bell (1873–1946), musician, composer and first director of the South African College of Music
 Steve Blinkhorn (b. 1949), occupational psychologist, has lived in St Albans for many years
 Nicholas Breakspear (c.1100–1159), later Pope Adrian IV, born in Abbots Langley, attended school in St Albans
 Jez Butterworth (b. 1969), writer, attended Verulam School
 Nathan Byrne (b. 1992), footballer, born in St Albans
 Cheryl Campbell (b. 1949), actor
 Paul Cattermole (b. 1977), former member of S Club 7, was born in St Albans
 Ralph Chubb (1892–1960), lithographer
 Sarah Churchill, Duchess of Marlborough (1660–1744), wife of John Churchill, 1st Duke of Marlborough and close friend of Queen Anne, was born in St Albans
 Chris Clark (b. 1979), electronic musician, attended school in St Albans
 Steve Collins (b. 1964), former boxer
 Sally Connolly (b. 1976), author and academic, attended St Albans School
 William Cowper, 1st Earl Cowper (c. 1665–1723), Lord Chancellor of England.
 Dark Stares, rock band, all members born in St Albans
 Christopher Debenham (b.1953), cricketer 
 Joanna Dennehy, serial killer
 Donovan, (b. 1946), Songwriter and folk singer lived in St Albans during the 1960s
 Stacey Dooley (b. 1987), television presenter, lives in St Albans
 Tom Dyckhoff (b. 1971), architecture critic and TV presenter, was born in St Albans
 Enter Shikari, post-hardcore band, all members born and raised in St Albans
 David Essex (b. 1947), singer, lives in St Albans
 Siobhan Fahey (b. 1957), singer from Bananarama and Shakespear's Sister, attended Loreto College
 Robert Fayrfax (1464–1521), composer and musician, worked in St Albans Abbey where he is buried
 Friendly Fires, indie pop band from St Albans
 Bruce Forsyth (1928–2017) lived in a house called Forsythier in Admirals Walk until 1958.
 Nick Gentry (b. 1980), portrait artist, attended school in St Albans 
 Nigel Gibbs (b. 1965), former Watford footballer, was born in St Albans
 Russell Green (b. 1959), cricketer
 Willis Hall (1929–2005), playwright and TV scriptwriter, lived in St Albans for many years and was for a while president of St Albans City F.C.
 Tommy Hampson (1907–1965), athlete, Olympic gold medal winner and world record holder, taught at St Albans School
 Tim Hart (1948–2009), musician and former guitarist in Steeleye Span, lived in St Albans and attended St Albans School
 John Hartson (b. 1975), footballer, lived in St Albans
 Stephen Hawking (1942–2018), theoretical physicist, educated at St Albans School
 Nick Helm (b. 1980), Actor, comedian and musician, born in St Albans and attended Cunningham Hill School and Sandringham School.
 Christopher Herbert (b. 1944), 9th Bishop of St Albans 1995–2009
 Jimmy Hill (1928–2015), TV presenter and football personality, lived in St Albans
 Ian Holloway (b. 1963), Millwall F.C manager, lived in St Albans
 Matthew Holness, comedian, better known as Garth Marenghi, lives in St Albans
 Edward Robert Hughes (1851-1914), artist, lived and died in St Albans. He is buried in Hatfield Road cemetery 
 Kurt Jackson, artist, lived in St Albans and attended Francis Bacon School as a teenager
 Jeffrey John (b. 1953), Dean of St Albans since 2004
 John of St Giles (c. 1180 – 1259–60; fl. 1230), Dominican friar and physician
 Minhyong Kim, mathematician, lives in St Albans
 Stanley Kubrick (1928–1999), film director, lived at Childwickbury Manor from 1978 until his death
 Adam Lallana (b. 1988), footballer, born in St Albans
 Stephen Lander (b. 1947), former head of MI5, has lived in St Albans for many years
 Mark Lawson (b. 1962), broadcaster and columnist for The Guardian, attended St Columba's College
 Christopher Lewis (b. 1944), Dean of St Albans 1994–2003
 John Mandeville (14th century), compiler of a singular book of supposed travels, reputedly born in St Albans
 Rosie Marcel (b. 1977), actor, Jac Naylor in BBC One's Holby City, lives in St Albans
 Nigel Marven, television wildlife presenter, was brought up in St Albans and attended Francis Bacon School
 Maximum Love, electronic music duo from St Albans
 Arthur Melbourne-Cooper (1874–1961), pioneering film-maker, born in St Albans
 Peter Mensah (b. 1959), actor, Oenomaus in the TV series Spartacus, grew up in St Albans
 Michael Morpurgo (b. 1943), author, born in St Albans
 Albert Moses (1937–2017), actor, Mind Your Language, producer and director, lived in St Albans
 John Motson (b. 1945), football commentator, lived in St Albans
 Herbert Mundin (1898–1939), character actor, lived in St Albans from a young age and was educated at St Albans School
 David Munrow,(1942–1976), a noted pioneer of Early music, lived in St Albans
 Alexander Neckam (1157–1217), an English magnetician, poet, theologian, and writer.
 Mike Newell (b. 1942), film director, lived in St Albans and attended St Albans School
 Ardal O'Hanlon (b. 1965), Father Ted star and stand-up comedian, lives in St Albans
 Eleanor Ormerod (1828–1901), entomologist, lived and died in St Albans.
 William Page (1861–1934), historian and editor, lived here 1896–1904 and took part in archaeological excavations in the city
 Matthew Paris (c.1200–1259), Benedictine monk, chronicler of the history of St Albans Abbey.
 Rupert Parkes (b. 1972) a.k.a. Photek, record producer and DJ, was born in St Albans
 Julian Perretta (b. 1989), singer-songwriter
 Allan Prior (1922–2006), TV scriptwriter, co-creator of Z-Cars, and father of Maddy Prior (b. 1947), lived in St Albans
 Chris Read (b. 1978), England cricketer, lives in St Albans
 Tim Rice (b. 1944), lyricist, attended St Albans School
 Ben Richards (b. 1972), actor, singer, Footballers' Wives, The Bill, lives in St Albans
 Luke Roberts (b. 1977), actor, Holby City, lives in St Albans
 Jim Rodford (1941–2018), musician, member of Argent, The Zombies and The Kinks and cousin of Rod Argent
 Henry Rogers (1806–1877), nonconformist minister and man of letters.
 James Runcie, author and film maker, lives in St Albans
 Robert Runcie (1921–2000), Bishop of St Albans 1970–1980, later Archbishop of Canterbury 1980–1991. Now buried in the grounds of St Albans Cathedral
 John D. Rutherford (b. 1941), Hispanist, born in St Albans
 Samuel Ryder (1858–1936), seed merchant, founder of the Ryder Cup
 George Gilbert Scott (1811–1878), architect, restored St Albans Abbey 1856–1877.
 John Sessions (b. 1953), actor and comedian, attended St Albans Boys' Grammar School (now Verulam School), patron of St Albans Arts
 Gilberto Silva (b. 1976), Brazilian footballer, played for Arsenal FC and lived in St Albans
 Clive Sinclair (1948–2018), author, lived in St Albans
 Alan Smith (b. 1957), Bishop of St Albans since 2009
 Justin Somper, author, born in St Albans
 Source Direct, drum and bass act. Both original members were born and schooled in St Albans.
 Jonathan Stroud (b. 1970), author, lived in St Albans
 Trash Boat, pop-punk band from St Albans
John Turner (1864–1949), Australian naval officer
 Ulsinus (fl. 10th century), Abbot of St Albans Abbey, reputed founder in 948 of St Albans School, and St Michael's, St Peter's and St Stephen's churches
 Mike Walling (b. 1950), comedy actor and scriptwriter, lived in St Albans 1997–2010
 Richard of Wallingford (1292–1336), Abbot of St Albans Abbey, mathematician, horologist and astronomer
 Private Edward Warner VC (1883–1915), soldier in the Bedfordshire Regiment, awarded a posthumous Victoria Cross for his actions during the Battle of Hill 60
 Thomas Spencer Wells (1818–1897), surgeon to Queen Victoria and president of the Royal College of Surgeons of England, born and educated in St Albans.
 Charles Williams (1886–1945), writer and publisher, lived in St Albans 1894–1917 and attended St Albans School
 Helen Wyman (b. 1981), cyclist, seven times British cyclo-cross champion, 2012 European cyclo-cross champion; born in St Albans
 Graham Frederick Young (1947–1990), the infamous "Teacup Poisoner", tried at St Albans Crown Court in 1972

References

 
St Albans